Annur Annadhana Vallal Dharmaveera Namboorar Sri K Govindaswamy Naidu (12 July 1907 - 28 January 1995), popularly known as KG, was an industrialist and philanthropist from Coimbatore, Tamil Nadu, South India.

Background
Annur Dharmaveera Namboorar Sri K Govindaswamy Naidu was born to an agricultural family. His formative years were difficult, and he had very little formal education. For a while, he worked with his father who was a highway contractor. He started his own business before he was twenty years old, after gaining experience in a grocery shop as an assistant.

Industry
In 1932, KG started his first ginning factory. Over the next six decades, his industrial ventures were in cotton ginning and spinning, weaving denim fabrics, manufacturing terry towels, castings, motor pumpsets and entertainment with an asset base of Rs.2 billion and sales of Rs. 3 billion, of which more than 25% came from exports. He believed in modern technology and set high standards in the business practices and for products manufactured. Revival of sick units was one of his business strategies. To create employment in rural areas, he located all his factories in villages, away from the urban areas. He insisted on employing women wherever possible. He was monumental in establishing Indias' first multiplex KG cinemas.

Philanthropy
KG was a proponent of such ideals as vegetarianism, teetotalism, piety, simple living and punctuality. He was an early riser who believed that hardwork and discipline helped achieve whatever goals you set in business. His favourite deity was Palani Sri Dhandayudapani Swamy, who he believed to be the source of all his achievements.

KG donated generously to a number of causes: religious, educational, medical service, social services, and poverty alleviation. Among his good works are six schools, a hospital with 550 beds, and scores of temples. Annandhanam – serving food — was his favorite act of service. He donated to mosques and churches also. He believed that he was only an instrument in the hands of Muruga in his service to humanity.

Recognition
In recognition of KG's philanthropy, Saravanampatti Adheenam bestowed the title "Annadhana Vallal" on him. Poojya Sri Mahasannidhanam Sri Sri Abhinava Vidya Teertha Mahaswamigal of Sri Sharada Peetham, Sringeri, bestowed the title "Dharmaveera" on KG for his contributions to religious activities, including the funding and construction of the Sharadambal temple (1979) at Race Course, Coimbatore.

The Department of Posts, part of the Ministry of Communications and Information Technology, Government of India, released a special postal cover of K Govindaswamy Naidu in commemoration of the centenary celebrations at a function in his hometown, Annur on 18 July 2009.

External links
 KG's business
 Department of Posts released a special postal cover of Naidu at Annur
 KG Group's contribution was featured prominently in a 2015 World Bank report titled "Competitive Cities For Jobs And Growth"  (Page 41 and Page 44)

1907 births
1995 deaths
Tamil activists
Tamil businesspeople